Austria competed at the 2022 World Aquatics Championships in Budapest, Hungary from 18 June to 3 July.

Medalists

Artistic swimming 

Women

Diving 

Men

Open water swimming 

 Men

Swimming 

 Men

 Women

References 

Nations at the 2022 World Aquatics Championships
World Aquatics Championships
2022